Samanyudu  is a 2006 Indian Telugu-language political action film produced by R. R. Venkat on  R.R. Movie Makers banner and directed by Ravi C Kumar. The film stars Jagapati Babu and Kamna Jethmalani, while Sai Kumar, Ranganath, Archana, Dasari Arun Kumar, and Vinod Kumar play supporting roles. The music was composed by Vandemataram Srinivas.

The film released on 19 October 2006. It won Nandi Awards for Best Story Writer and Best Villain and a Filmfare Award for Best Supporting Actor (Telugu).

Plot
The film begins in Addam newspaper its editor Chandrashekhar a rectitude always fights to expose the evils in society. He reared 3 orphans Chandra, Abhi, & Aparna who have settled abroad. Once, an abrupt attempt happens on Chandrashekar. Since he is to show up major scams made by Home Minister Bhagawan Raj. Bhagawan Raj is scandalous malice who runs vicious politics and defrauded 600 crores of public money in the spam 4 years. Being aware of the plight, Chandrashekar’s children back when Chandra talks wrongly regarding system & society. Like a shot, Chandrashekar's retort makes him understand the social conscience of a common man. Soon after the recovery, Chandrashekar announces a statement. So, Bhagawan Raj hangs him by his sidekick Lingam Goud and designs it a suicide. Now Chandra pledges to continue his father’s legacy and takes up Addam’s responsibility as Editor. He marches forward in his father's footsteps i.e. To change the people without any Harm his sibling and sub-editor Das a trustworthy aids him. 

Firstly, they intel and bares Raja Reddy chair of Vaishnavi Bank swindles hundreds of crores of depositors including Bhagawan Raj in the scam. Here, Chandra clutches Patnaik an acolyte of Bhagawan Raj, and turns him into his counterspy. Parallelly, an unknown double agent crosses the messages to Bhagawan Raj from Chandra’s camp. Alongside, Vandana sister of Lingam Goud likes Chandra without his knowledge and rags him via telephonic conversation. Anyhow, he detects her and falls in love. The next, Bhagawan Raj ruses assassinating the Chief Minister to lay hold of his seat. Chandra perceives it by Patnaik, terminates the dangerous violence, and also accumulates pieces of evidence against Bhagawan Raj. Utilizing it, he coerces Bhagawan Raj to keep faith in his election words and spend his illicit gains on the public welfare.

As it is inescapable Bhagawan Raj embarks on the tasks and acts according to Chandra. But unexpectedly, he gains great acclaim which slowly reforms him. Moreover, his daughter Bindu is an ailed heart patient who has to panic to her father nears him. Meanwhile, Bhagawan Raj recognizes Patnaik as a traitor by his handler and slays him. Plus, he is aware of Chandra & Vandana’s love affair. So, he plots to slaughter Chandra by Lingam Goud which fails as Chandra obtains proof anti to him also. Wherefore, he makes him a puppet and engages with Vandana. Subsequently, Bhagawan Raj deputes a wicked cop Commissioner Kalyan who warns him to give up the proofs. Then, Chandra decides to uncover the diabolic shade of Bhagawan Raj and assigns Abhi & Das to do the job.

As a flabbergast, Chandra’s team’s impostor is unveiled as Aparna. Since she avenges Chandrashekar who is responsible for her family’s death through his paper, hence, she has mingled with Bhagawan Raj to execute her aim of destroying Addam. Aparna kills Das and attains one of the proofs but Abhi succeeds in getting another. Thus, Chandra starts printing. At the same time, Bindu becomes terminally ill which recoups with the blessings and prayers of the public. The incident molds Bhagawan Raj into a complete man. However, he discovers that Chandra going to break his true face. Forthwith, he rushes therein, be startled he shoots Aparna and rescues Chandra. At last, after soul-searching, Bhagawan Raj proclaims that he felt real happiness by serving people and attempts suicide. Chandra bars him and orders his men to stop printing. Finally, the movie ends with Chandra stating Every Common Man wants a Leader like him.

Cast

 Jagapati Babu as Chandra
 Kamna Jethmalani as Vandana
 Sai Kumar as Bhagawan Raj
 Ranganath as Chandrasekhar
 Archana as Aparna
 Dasari Arun Kumar as Abhi
 Vinod Kumar as Kotilingam Lingam Goud
 M. Balayya as CM Veda Prakash
 Banerjee as ACP Kondal Rao
 Ahuti Prasad as Commissioner Kalyan
 Rajiv Kanakala as Das
 Ashok Kumar as Bank Chairman Raja Reddy
 Rami Reddy as MLA Ramu Yadav
 Narra Venkateswara Rao as MLA Naidu
 M. S. Narayana as Narayana, Chandra's uncle
 Duvvasi Mohan as Narasimha, Bhagawan's P.A.
 Sujitha as Lakshmi
 Satya Krishnan as Vidya
 Raghunatha Reddy as Ramunujam
 Jenny as Dr. Devadinam
 Gundu Sudharshan as Ramaiya
 Fish Venkat as Venkat
 CVL Narasimha Rao as Aparna's father
 Subhanini as Narayana's wife
 Sathanna as MLA Ratnakar
 Chintu as Patnaik
 Baby Harshita as Bindu
 Master Karthik as Young Chandra
 Master Nikhil as Young Abhi
 Baby Greeshma as Young Aparna
 Mumaith Khan as an item number

Soundtrack

The music was composed by Vandemataram Srinivas as released on Aditya Music Company.

100-days function
The film completed a 100-day run at the box office on January 26, 2007. The makers of the film held a function at Raavi Narayana Reddy Auditorium in Hyderabad on January 31, 2007. V. B. Rajendra Prasad, T. Subbarami Reddy, APSP DIG Gopinath Reddy, D. Ramanaidu, Srikanth, and Uday Kiran attended this event.

Awards

References

External links
 

2000s Telugu-language films
Indian films about revenge
2006 films
Indian action films
Films about journalism
Films about journalists
2006 action films